This is a list of letters of the Cyrillic script. The definition of a Cyrillic letter for this list is a character encoded in the Unicode standard that a has script property of 'Cyrillic' and the general category of 'Letter'. An overview of the distribution of Cyrillic letters in Unicode is given in Cyrillic script in Unicode.

Letters contained in the Russian alphabet
Letters contained in the Russian alphabet.

Letters unused in Russian

Extensions 

|Ѹ ѹ
|Uk
|early Cyrillic alphabet

Letters with diacritics

Ligatures

Position Cyrillic letters in alphabet 

Variants of Cyrillic are used by the writing systems of many languages, especially languages used in the former Soviet Union. The tables below list the Cyrillic letters in use in various modern languages and show the primary sounds they represent in them (see the articles on the specific languages for more detail). Letter forms with a combined diacritic which are not considered separate letters in any language (notably vowels with accent marks which are sometimes used in some languages to indicate stress and/or tone) are excluded from the tables, with the exception of ѐ and ѝ. The highlighted letters are those of the basic (original) Cyrillic alphabet; archaic letters no longer in use in any language today are not listed.

For letters not on this list, see Template:Infobox Cyrillic letter.

Summary table

See also
Cyrillic script 
Cyrillic digraphs
Cyrillic characters in Unicode
Languages using Cyrillic
List of Latin letters

Notes

  ѐ and ѝ – considered variants of е and и, respectively, not separate letters – are included here because they are used in some South Slavic languages for preventing ambiguity and have been assigned separate Unicode code points.
  The letters з́ and с́ only appear in the Montenegrin alphabet, which is otherwise identical to the Serbian alphabet and was not given a separate column.
  In normal Russian texts ё is written without the dots, that is it appears as е. The dots are sometimes added to prevent ambiguity or in children books.
  In the indicated languages, ъ indicates that the preceding consonant is not iotated.
  In Ossetian, ъ is combined with consonants to indicate new phonemes, most commonly ejective consonants.
  In Chechen, ь is combined with both consonants and vowels to indicate various new phonemes.
  Only used in borrowings, not in native words.

There are many languages that use two or more scripts, for example Latin or Arabic.
In Belarusian and Ukrainian there is an apostrophe to indicate de-palatalization of the preceding consonant.
Azerbaijani has the apostrophe  as a letter.
Nenets has the apostrophe  and double apostrophe  as letters.

References

External links

 Cyrillic Alphabets of Slavic Languages review of Cyrillic charsets in Slavic Languages.
 Unicode collation charts—including Cyrillic letters, sorted by shape